State Fair is a 1932 novel by Phil Stong about an Iowa farm family's visit to the Iowa State Fair, where the family's two teenage children each fall in love, but ultimately break up with their respective new loves and return to their familiar life back on the farm. Thomas Leslie, the author of Iowa State Fair: Country Comes to Town, wrote that the novel State Fair is "a surprisingly dark coming-of-age story that took as its major plot device the effects of the 'worldly temptations' of the Iowa State Fair on a local farming family", capturing tensions between urban Des Moines and rural Iowa.

The novel became a bestseller and established Stong as a popular author. Shortly after its publication, the novel was made into a Hollywood film starring Will Rogers (albeit with the addition of a happy "Hollywood ending" not in the book), and was subsequently adapted for the stage and screen several more times, including as a Rodgers and Hammerstein movie musical in 1945.

Plot
The novel follows the Frake family from the fictional town of Brunswick, Iowa. The father, Abel, has a Hampshire boar named "Blue Boy" that he thinks can win the grand championship at the Iowa State Fair. At the beginning of the story, he bets the local Storekeeper that "Blue Boy" will win the grand prize and that the Frakes will all have a good time at the fair and be better off for it when the fair is over. The pessimistic Storekeeper accepts the bet, but also bets that if he (the Storekeeper) loses, something "worse than anything you can think of" will have happened to the Frakes at the fair unbeknownst to Abel.

The mother, Melissa, has a set of pickles and wants to win blue ribbons for them, beating the competition that has won in prior years. Teenage son Wayne has been practicing so he can win at the "hoop-la" ring toss stand and get revenge on the crooked carnival barker who had taken his money and pride in previous years. Teenage daughter Margy just wants to enjoy herself at the fair and take a break from everyday life. Both teenagers are also in the mood for a new romance. Wayne worries that his girlfriend, Eleanor, who has just spent her first year at college and will not be accompanying him to the fair, has gotten too sophisticated for him. Margy meanwhile finds herself bored with her responsible, devoted, but dull boyfriend Harry Ware, who has planned their whole lives as a farm couple already, and will also not be coming to the fair.

At the fair, both Abel's hog and Melissa's pickles win blue ribbons, and both Wayne and Margy meet and fall in love with exciting new people whose backgrounds are very different from their own. At the hoop-la stand, Wayne meets Emily, the motherless daughter of a stock show manager, who lives a rootless life in hotels following horse shows, horse races and carnivals. Emily's father is preoccupied with horses, womanizing and gambling, and leaves his daughter mostly on her own. She uses her inside knowledge of horse racing to make money by betting, wears short skirts, goes to the theater, and drinks alcohol despite Prohibition. She gives Wayne his first drink and seduces him in her hotel room. On their last night at the fair, Wayne proposes, but Emily refuses because, while she loves Wayne, he has been raised to run a farm, and she does not want to give up her cosmopolitan lifestyle to become the hard-working farm wife Wayne would need. Instead, she plans to spend her large sum of horse-racing winnings on one last night of fun with Wayne and then say a "fond farewell" forever.

While riding the roller coaster, Margy also meets a new companion, a reporter for the Des Moines Register named Pat Gilbert. Pat is experienced and widely traveled, having worked in a number of cities and had previous girlfriends; yet, he is attracted to Margy despite her relative lack of sophistication. Margy finds him more exciting than the predictable Harry Ware. Margy and Pat fall in love, she loses her virginity to him in a grove near her family's camp, and he proposes marriage. However, Margy ultimately turns Pat down because, although she loves him, she does not think he would be happy staying in one town such as Brunswick with her. Although Pat tries to convince her that he can adjust, he also has career ambitions to work in New York City, where Margy feels she would be out of her element and unlike Pat, does not have confidence that she could adapt. She realizes that, while she does not love Harry, she loves "his kind of life" and decides to marry Harry instead of Pat.

The Frake family returns home after the fair, with Wayne and Margy both in somber moods. Abel and Melissa have been kept mostly in the dark about their children's romantic escapades during the fair, especially the premarital sex (regarded as a serious moral breach in that time and place, particularly if the partners did not later marry). Therefore, the parents assume that Wayne and Margy are simply sad to see the fair end. Although they are momentarily sad, Wayne and Margy, having each learned a lesson and come of age, are ready to return to the farm and resume their relationships with their previous partners, Eleanor and Harry.

Upon returning home, Abel Frake collects his five-dollar bet from the Storekeeper, since Blue Boy won the grand prize and the family all had a good time. The Storekeeper pays his bet, but looking at Wayne and Margy, he also feels sure that his own prediction came true and something "worse than anything you can think of" happened at the fair without Abel's knowledge.

Development
Before writing State Fair, Iowa native Stong worked as a writer for various newspapers and advertising agencies, and had written twelve unpublished novels. In 1931, Stong's wife, Virginia Maude Swaine, suggested that he write a story about the Iowa State Fair. Although Stong and his wife were living in New York City by that time, Stong was familiar with the fair; he had attended it while growing up in Iowa, had previously covered its evening stock shows when he worked for the Des Moines Register, and his grandfather had been the superintendent of the fair's swine division for several years. Stong proceeded to write 10,000 words of his novel in only three days. Stong was further encouraged to finish the book by his agent, who told him that publishers were seeking "a Sinclair Lewis story more humorous and fairer to small town people than Main Street".

Robert A. McCown wrote in his foreword to the 1996 University of Iowa Press edition of State Fair that the work "is very much an Iowa book, filled with incidents and details from the author's own life." However, McCown noted that although the early 20th century state fair setting was "accurately portrayed", Stong was a novelist, not a historian, and that "there is undeniably an element of make-believe" in the work. According to McCown, Stong wrote "an artistic representation of the fair, not presenting the literal truth."

Reception
The book was originally published in the late spring of 1932 by The Century Company of Philadelphia. Although Stong expected it to sell about 10,000 copies, it greatly exceeded his expectations, becoming a bestseller in New York, Chicago, and other major cities, and then being named a Literary Guild selection, causing sales to further skyrocket. Grosset and Dunlap reprinted the book in 1933. Other editions followed, including paperbacks, foreign editions, and one for members of the United States Armed Forces. State Fair continued to attract readers for decades and is considered to be Stong's most successful work.

While most reviews were favorable, the book met with some disapproval on moral grounds. Many Iowans perceived the Frake daughter and son's behavior as "loose", and Stong wrote to a friend at the time that "Iowa generally felt that Iowa girls wouldn't do such things." The city library in Stong's hometown of Keosauqua, Iowa banned the book as immoral for 25 years. Some reviewers also criticized the book's rosy depiction of farm life as unrealistic in the midst of the economic troubles farmers were then facing during the Great Depression.

Due to the success of State Fair, Stong was able to quit his newspaper and advertising jobs. Stong bought his mother's family farm, the George C. Duffield Estate, with proceeds from the book and subsequently made improvements and leased the property.

Adaptations
The novel was adapted, under the same title, into three feature films released to theaters, a stage musical, and a television movie. In the three feature film versions and the musical, the ending is consistently changed from the book so that Margy, after returning home from the fair, is contacted by her love interest Pat Gilbert (renamed "Jerry Dundee" in the 1962 film) and happily reunites with him. The character of Emily, including her name, her profession, and the circumstances of her breakup with Wayne, underwent the most change, being slightly different in each of the adaptations. The 1976 television version changed many aspects of the original story, including most of the character names, and kept only the basic concept of an Iowa farm family going to the Iowa State Fair, where the family's son and daughter find romance.

Actor George Golden appeared in all four State Fair films, appearing in the 1976 television movie at the age of 71.

1933 feature film

In 1933, Hollywood quickly followed up on the popular success of the previous year's bestselling novel by releasing the first version of State Fair — a Pre-Code black-and-white non-musical film starring Janet Gaynor as Margy Frake and Will Rogers as her father Abel. In this version, the Emily character is an older, sophisticated trapeze artist named Emily Joyce, who seduces Wayne, with the most suggestive scene later being cut from the film when it was reissued two years after its release. But Emily ultimately refuses to marry Wayne, implying that while she loves him, he is too good for her. Director Henry King changed the ending of the original novel for the film version, so that instead of Margy marrying her hometown boyfriend Harry, Pat telephones Margy at home after the fair, then drives to her house and the couple embrace as the film ends.

1945 feature film

In 1945, the second version of State Fair was released: a Technicolor musical starring Jeanne Crain as Margy and Dana Andrews as Pat, and featuring Rodgers and Hammerstein songs written originally for the film, rather than for a stage musical. In this version, Wayne (played by Dick Haymes) falls in love with Emily Edwards (played by Vivian Blaine), the singer of a dance band performing at the Fair, and competes with the male singer in her band for her affections, before finding out from a song promoter that she is already unhappily married and didn't want to tell him. Margy and Pat again reunite after the fair.

1962 musical film

In 1962, the musical was updated and remade into the third version of State Fair starring Pat Boone as Wayne and Ann-Margret as Emily, but with the setting moved to the Texas State Fair and the "Pat Gilbert" newspaper reporter character changed to a television interviewer named "Jerry Dundee" (played by Bobby Darin). This version also featured additional songs written by Richard Rodgers. In this version, Wayne aims to compete in an automobile race at the fair and get revenge on a competitor who previously bested and insulted him. Wayne gets engaged to Emily Porter, a showgirl at the fair, but after Emily overhears Melissa referring to her as "trash", she tearfully breaks up with Wayne, claiming that her career is more important. As in the earlier versions, Margy and her love interest, Jerry, reunite after the fair.

Stage musical

The Rodgers and Hammerstein film version set in Iowa was later produced as a stage musical with some additional songs, mostly composed for other Rodgers and Hammerstein productions. It premiered in St. Louis, Missouri in 1969, starring Ozzie and Harriet Nelson as Abel and Melissa Frake. In 1996, David Merrick produced a revised Broadway version featuring John Davidson as Abel, Andrea McArdle as Margy, and Donna McKechnie as Emily, which ran for 118 performances. The production was co-directed by James Hammerstein and Randy Skinner and choreographed by Skinner. Wayne's love affair is portrayed similarly to the 1945 film; the character Emily Arden is a singer at the fair who refuses to marry Wayne because she has already been married and walked out on her husband, and does not want to hurt Wayne in the same way, choosing instead to focus on her singing career. However, unlike in the film, Emily reveals this to Wayne herself. As in the previous films, Margy and Pat reunite at the end.

1976 television film

In 1976, an additional  made-for-television adaptation, updating the story to the 1970s and starring Vera Miles as mother Melissa (with the family name changed from "Frake" to "Bryant", other names changed and a second son and grandson added to the family), was produced in 1976 as a pilot for CBS. The pilot focused on teenage son Wayne Bryant (Mitch Vogel), an aspiring country musician, and his efforts to win a musical talent competition at the Iowa State Fair, while falling in love with a young singer named Bobbie Jean Shaw (Linda Purl) who is also competing. The daughter character, named "Karen" rather than "Margy", is married but separated from her husband and has a young son; she becomes attracted to a former classmate she meets at the fair. The pilot did not result in a series.

Sequel
Stong was not pleased with director Henry King's decision to create a "Hollywood ending" for the initial film version of State Fair by reuniting Margy with Pat after the fair. However, twenty years after the publication of State Fair, Stong published a sequel, Return in August (1953), in which Margy, now a widow after Harry's sudden death, and Pat, now a successful reporter for elite magazines, meet again at the Iowa State Fair and resume their romance.

Further reading

 Hassler, Donald M. (Kent State University). "Phil(ip) (Duffield) Stong." Located in: Greasley, Philip A. (editor) Dictionary of Midwestern Literature: The Authors. Indiana University Press, 2001, pp. 474–475. , 9780253336095.
 McCown, Robert A. "Foreword." Located in: Stong, Phil. State Fair. University of Iowa Press, 1996 ed., pp. vii-xiv. , 9780877455691.
 Rasmussen, Chris. "Agricultural Lag: The Fair in Fiction." Located in: Carnival in the Countryside: The History of the Iowa State Fair. University of Iowa Press, 2015, pp. 133–144. .

References

1932 American novels
American novels adapted into films
Culture of Des Moines, Iowa
Novels set in Iowa
Iowa State Fair